The following is a list of demons, ghosts,  and other legendary creatures that are notable in Japanese folklore and mythology.

A

B

C

D

E

F

G

H

I

J

K

M

N

O

R

S

T

U

W

Y

Z

See also
 Japanese mythology

References

External links
 Photo Dictionary of Japanese Buddhist and Shinto Deities
 百物語怪談会 Hyakumonogatari Kaidankai | Translated Japanese Ghost Stories and Tales of the Weird and the Strange, a blog by Mizuki Shigeru 
 133 Yokai Statues on Mizuki Shigeru Road

 
 
Japan
Japan
Legendary creatures from Japan